The Nechako Lakes is an informal term for group of lakes in Northern British Columbia, Canada on the Nechako Plateau.  Major lakes in the group are Babine Lake, Francois Lake, Ootsa Lake, Trembleur Lake, Takla Lake and Stuart Lake.  "Nechako Lakes," "Nechako Lakes District" and "Lakes District" is used as a regional identifier for several organizations in the area, such as School District #91 (Nechako Lakes).  The more common name for the northern part of the region the lakes are located in is the Omineca Country, for the southern the Nechako Country.

Lakes of British Columbia
Omineca Country
Nechako Country
Lake groups of Canada